Robert Bernard Altman (February 20, 1925 – November 20, 2006) was an American film director, screenwriter, and producer. He was a five-time nominee of the Academy Award for Best Director and is considered an enduring figure from the New Hollywood era.

Altman's style of filmmaking covered many genres, but usually with a "subversive" twist which typically relied on satire and humor to express his personal views. Altman developed a reputation for being "anti-Hollywood" and non-conformist in both his themes and directing style. Actors especially enjoyed working under his direction because he encouraged them to improvise, thereby inspiring their own creativity.

He preferred large ensemble casts for his films, and developed a multitrack recording technique which produced overlapping dialogue from multiple actors. This produced a more natural, more dynamic, and more complex experience for the viewer. He also used highly mobile camera work and zoom lenses to enhance the activity taking place on the screen. Critic Pauline Kael, writing about his directing style, said that Altman could "make film fireworks out of next to nothing." Altman's most famous directorial achievements include M*A*S*H (1970), McCabe & Mrs. Miller (1971), The Long Goodbye (1973), Nashville (1975), 3 Women (1977), The Player (1992), Short Cuts (1993), and Gosford Park (2001).

In 2006, the Academy of Motion Picture Arts and Sciences recognized Altman's body of work with an Academy Honorary Award. He never won a competitive Oscar despite seven nominations. His films M*A*S*H, McCabe & Mrs. Miller, The Long Goodbye and Nashville have been selected for the United States National Film Registry. Altman is one of three filmmakers whose films have won the Golden Bear at Berlin, the Golden Lion at Venice, and the Golden Palm at Cannes (the other two being Henri-Georges Clouzot and Michelangelo Antonioni).

Early life 
Altman was born on February 20, 1925, in Kansas City, Missouri, the son of Helen (née Matthews), a Mayflower descendant from Nebraska, and Bernard Clement Altman, a wealthy insurance salesman and amateur gambler, who came from an upper-class family. Altman's ancestry was German, English and Irish; his paternal grandfather, Frank Altman Sr., anglicized the spelling of the family name from "Altmann" to "Altman". Altman had a Catholic upbringing, but he did not continue to follow or practice the religion as an adult, although he has been referred to as "a sort of Catholic" and a Catholic director. He was educated at Jesuit schools, including Rockhurst High School, in Kansas City. He graduated from Wentworth Military Academy in Lexington, Missouri in 1943.

Soon after graduation, Altman joined the United States Army Air Forces at the age of 18. During World War II, Altman flew more than 50 bombing missions as a co-pilot of a B-24 Liberator with the 307th Bomb Group in Borneo and the Dutch East Indies.
Upon his discharge in 1947, Altman moved to California. He worked in publicity for a company that had invented a tattooing machine to identify dogs. He entered filmmaking on a whim, selling a script to RKO for the 1948 picture Bodyguard, which he co-wrote with George W. George. Altman's immediate success encouraged him to move to New York City, where he attempted to forge a career as a writer. Having enjoyed little success, he returned to Kansas City in 1949; where he accepted a job as a director and writer of industrial films for the Calvin Company. Altman directed some 65 industrial films and documentaries for the Calvin Company. Through his early work on industrial films, Altman experimented with narrative technique and developed his characteristic use of overlapping dialogue. In February 2012, an early Calvin film directed by Altman, Modern Football (1951), was found by filmmaker Gary Huggins.

Career

1950s
Altman's first forays into TV directing were on the DuMont drama series Pulse of the City (1953–1954), and an episode of the 1956 western series The Sheriff of Cochise. In 1956, he was hired by a local businessman to write and direct a feature film in Kansas City on juvenile delinquency. The film, titled The Delinquents, made for $60,000, was purchased by United Artists for $150,000, and released in 1957. While primitive, this teen exploitation film contained the foundations of Altman's later work in its use of casual, naturalistic dialogue. With its success, Altman moved from Kansas City to California for the last time. He co-directed The James Dean Story (1957), a documentary rushed into theaters to capitalize on the actor's recent death and marketed to his emerging cult following. Both works caught the attention of Alfred Hitchcock who hired Altman as a director for his CBS anthology series Alfred Hitchcock Presents. After just two episodes, Altman resigned due to differences with a producer, but this exposure enabled him to forge a successful TV career. Over the next decade Altman worked prolifically in television (and almost exclusively in series dramas) directing multiple episodes of Whirlybirds, The Millionaire, U.S. Marshal, The Troubleshooters, The Roaring 20s, Bonanza, Bus Stop, Kraft Mystery Theater,  Combat!, as well as single episodes of several other notable series including Hawaiian Eye, Maverick (the fourth season episode "Bolt From the Blue" also written by Altman and starring Roger Moore), Lawman, Surfside 6, Peter Gunn, and Route 66.

1960s
By the 1960s, Altman established himself as a TV director due to his ability to work quickly and efficiently on a limited budget. Though he was frequently fired from TV projects for refusing to conform to network mandates, Altman always was able to land new assignments. In 1964, the producers decided to expand "Once Upon a Savage Night", one of his episodes of Kraft Suspense Theatre, for release as a TV movie under the title Nightmare in Chicago. In a 1963 episode, "The Hunt", his cast included James Caan and Bruce Dern.

Two years later, Altman was hired to direct the low-budget space travel feature Countdown, but was fired within days of the project's conclusion because he had refused to edit the film to a manageable length. He worked with Caan again, who led the cast with Robert Duvall. He did not direct another film until That Cold Day in the Park (1969), which was a critical and box-office disaster.

During the decade, Altman began to express political subtexts within his works. In particular, he expressed antiwar sentiments regarding the Vietnam War. Because of this, Altman's career would somewhat suffer as he came to be associated with the anti-war movement.

1970s

In 1969, Altman was offered the script for MASH, an adaptation of a little-known Korean War-era novel satirizing life in the armed services; more than a dozen other filmmakers had passed on it. Altman had been hesitant to take the production, and the shoot was so tumultuous that Elliott Gould and Donald Sutherland tried to have Altman fired over his unorthodox filming methods. Nevertheless, MASH was widely hailed as a classic upon its 1970 release. It won the Palme d'Or at the 1970 Cannes Film Festival and netted five Academy Award nominations. It was Altman's highest-grossing film, released during a time of increasing anti-war sentiment in the United States. The Academy Film Archive preserved MASH in 2000.

Now recognized as a major talent, Altman notched critical successes with McCabe & Mrs. Miller (1971), a Revisionist Western in which the mordant songs of Leonard Cohen underscore a gritty vision of the American frontier; The Long Goodbye (1973), a controversial adaptation of the Raymond Chandler novel (scripted by Leigh Brackett) now ranked as a seminal influence on the neo-noir subgenre; Thieves Like Us (1974), an adaptation of the Edward Anderson novel previously filmed by Nicholas Ray as They Live by Night (1949); California Split (1974), a gambling comedy-drama shot partially on location in Reno, Nevada; and Nashville (1975), which had a strong political theme set against the world of country music. The stars of the film wrote their own songs; Keith Carradine won an Academy Award for the song "I'm Easy". Although his films were often met with divisive notices, many of the prominent film critics of the era (including Pauline Kael, Vincent Canby and Roger Ebert) remained steadfastly loyal to his directorial style throughout the decade.

Audiences took some time to appreciate his films, and he did not want to have to satisfy studio officials. In 1970, following the release of MASH, he founded Lion's Gate Films to have independent production freedom. Altman's company is not to be confused with the current Lionsgate, a Canada/U.S. entertainment company. The films he made through his company included Brewster McCloud, A Wedding, 3 Women, and Quintet.

1980s 

In 1980, he directed the musical film Popeye. Produced by Robert Evans and written by Jules Feiffer, the film was based on the comic strip / cartoon of the same name and starred Shelley Duvall and the comedian Robin Williams in his film debut. Designed as a vehicle to increase Altman's commercial clout following a series of critically acclaimed but commercially unsuccessful low-budget films in the late 1970s (including 3 Women, A Wedding and Quintet), the production was filmed on location in Malta. It was soon beleaguered by heavy drug and alcohol use among most of the cast and crew, including the director; Altman reportedly clashed with Evans, Williams (who threatened to leave the film), and songwriter Harry Nilsson (who departed midway through the shoot, leaving Van Dyke Parks to finish the orchestrations). Although the film grossed $60 million worldwide on a $20 million budget and was the second highest-grossing film Altman had directed to that point, it failed to meet studio expectations and was considered a box office disappointment.

In 1981, the director sold Lion's Gate to producer Jonathan Taplin after his political satire Health (shot in early 1979 for a Christmas release) was shelved by longtime distributor 20th Century Fox following tepid test and festival screenings throughout 1980. The departure of longtime Altman partisan Alan Ladd Jr. from Fox also played a decisive role in forestalling the release of the film.

Unable to secure major financing in the post-New Hollywood blockbuster era because of his mercurial reputation and the particularly tumultuous events surrounding the production of Popeye, Altman began to "direct literate dramatic properties on shoestring budgets for stage, home video, television, and limited theatrical release," including the acclaimed Secret Honor and Come Back to the Five and Dime, Jimmy Dean, Jimmy Dean, a critically antipodean adaptation of a play that Altman had directed on Broadway.

In 1982, Altman staged a production of Igor Stravinsky's The Rake's Progress at the University of Michigan, where he concurrently taught a course on his films. Shortly thereafter, he returned to film Secret Honor with students. In 2008, the University of Michigan Library acquired Altman's archive. He also co-wrote John Anderson's 1983 hit single "Black Sheep".

The teen comedy O.C. and Stiggs (1985), an abortive return to Hollywood filmmaking retrospectively characterized by the British Film Institute as "probably Altman's least successful film", received a belated limited commercial release in 1987 after being shelved by MGM.

Adapted by Altman and Sam Shepard for The Cannon Group from Shepard's Pulitzer Prize-nominated play, Fool for Love (1985) featured the playwright-actor alongside Kim Basinger, Harry Dean Stanton, and Randy Quaid; it fared better than most of his films from the era, earning $900,000 domestically on a $2 million budget and positive reviews from Roger Ebert and Vincent Canby. Still, widespread popularity with audiences continued to elude him.

He continued to regain a modicum of critical favor for his television mockumentary Tanner '88 (1988), a collaboration with Garry Trudeau set in the milieu of a United States presidential campaign, for which he earned a Primetime Emmy Award.

1990s
In 1990, Altman directed Vincent & Theo, a biographical film about Vincent van Gogh that was intended as a television miniseries for broadcast in the United Kingdom. A theatrical version of the film was a modest success in the United States, marking a significant turning point in the director's critical resurgence.

He revitalized his career in earnest with The Player (1992), a satire of Hollywood. Co-produced by the influential David Brown (The Sting, Jaws, Cocoon), the film was nominated for three Academy Awards, including Best Director. While he did not win the Oscar, he was awarded Best Director by the Cannes Film Festival, BAFTA, and the New York Film Critics Circle.

Altman then directed Short Cuts (1993), an ambitious adaptation of several short stories by Raymond Carver, which portrayed the lives of various citizens of Los Angeles over the course of several days. The film's large cast and intertwining of many different storylines were similar to his large-cast films of the 1970s; he won the Golden Lion at the 1993 Venice International Film Festival and another Oscar nomination for Best Director.

The rest of the 1990s saw limited success for Altman.  His 1994 release Prêt-à-Porter (also known as Ready to Wear) garnered significant pre-release publicity, but was a commercial and critical flop, though it got several nominations for year-end awards, including two Golden Globe nominations and won the National Board of Review award for Best Acting By An Ensemble.  In 1996, Altman directed Kansas City, expressing his love of 1930s jazz through a complicated kidnapping story.  The story received lukewarm-to-positive reviews, but made next to nothing at the box office, as did the 1998 legal thriller The Gingerbread Man.

He did close the decade on a high note, with 1999's Cookie's Fortune, a quirky black comedy about the suicide of a wealthy dowager, his first film in almost 6 years to make back its budget, and which earned him generally positive praise from critics.  He was elected a Fellow of the American Academy of Arts and Sciences in 1999.

2000s
Gosford Park (2001), a large-cast, British country house murder mystery, was included on many critics' lists of the ten best films of that year. It won the Academy Award for Best Original Screenplay (Julian Fellowes) plus six more nominations, including two for Altman, as Best Director and Best Picture.

Working with independent studios such as the now-shuttered Fine Line, Artisan (which was absorbed into today's Lionsgate), and USA Films (now Focus Features), gave Altman the edge in making the kinds of films he always wanted to make without studio interference. A film version of Garrison Keillor's public radio series A Prairie Home Companion was released in June 2006. Altman was still developing new projects up until his death, including a film based on Hands on a Hard Body: The Documentary (1997).

In 2006, the Academy of Motion Picture Arts and Sciences awarded Altman an Academy Honorary Award for Lifetime Achievement. During his acceptance speech, he revealed that he had received a heart transplant approximately ten or eleven years earlier. The director then quipped that perhaps the Academy had acted prematurely in recognizing the body of his work, as he felt like he might have four more decades of life ahead of him.

Directing style and technique

Maverick and auteur 

Following his successful career in television, Altman began his new career in the movie industry when he was in middle-age. He understood the creative limits imposed by the television genre, and now set out to direct and write films which would express his personal visions about American society and Hollywood. His films would later be described as "auteuristic attacks" and "idiosyncratic variations" of traditional films, typically using subtle comedy or satire as a way of expressing his observations.

His films were typically related to political, ideological, and personal subjects, and Altman was known for "refusing to compromise his own artistic vision." He has been described as "anti-Hollywood," often ignoring the social pressures that affected others in the industry, which made it more difficult for him to get many of his films seen. He said his independence as a filmmaker helped him overall:

"Altman was a genuine movie maverick," states author Ian Freer, because he went against the commercial conformity of the movie industry: "He was the scourge of the film establishment, and his work generally cast an astute, scathing eye over the breadth of American culture, often exploding genres and character archetypes; Altman was fascinated by people with imperfections, people as they really are, not as the movies would have you believe." Director Alan Rudolph, during a special tribute to Altman, refers to his moviemaking style as "Altmanesque."

With his independent style of directing, he developed a bad reputation among screenwriters and those on the business side of films. He admits, "I have a bad reputation with writers, developed over the years: 'Oh, he doesn't do what you write, blah blah blah.' ... Ring Lardner was very pissed off with me," for not following his script. Nor did Altman get along well with studio heads, once punching an executive in the nose and knocking him into a swimming pool because he insisted he cut six minutes from a film he was working on.

His reputation among actors was better. With them, his independence sometimes extended to his choice of actors, often going against consensus. Cher, for instance, credits him for launching her career with both the stage play and film, Come Back to the Five and Dime, Jimmy Dean, Jimmy Dean (1982). "Without Bob I would have never had a film career. Everyone told him not to cast me. Everyone. ... Nobody would give me a break. I am convinced that Bob was the only one who was brave enough to do it." Others, like Julianne Moore, describes working with him:

Director Robert Dornhelm said Altman "looked at film as a pure, artistic venue." With Short Cuts (1993), for instance, the distributor "begged him" to cut a few minutes from the length, to keep it commercially viable: "Bob just thought the antiChrist was trying to destroy his art. They were well-meaning people who wanted him to get what he deserved, which was a big commercial hit. But when it came down to the art or the money, he was with the art."

Sally Kellerman, noting Altman's willful attitude, looked back with regret at giving up a chance to act in one of his films:

Themes and subjects 
Unlike directors whose work fits within various film genres, such as Westerns, musicals, war films, or comedies, Altman's work has been defined as more "anti-genre" by various critics. This is partly due to the satirical and comedy nature of many of his films. Geraldine Chaplin, daughter of Charlie Chaplin, compared the humor in his films to her father's films:

Altman made it clear that he did not like "storytelling" in his films, contrary to the way most television and mainstream movies are made. According to Altman biographer Mitchell Zuckoff, "he disliked the word 'story,' believing that a plot should be secondary to an exploration of pure (or, even better, impure) human behavior." Zuckoff describes the purposes underlying many of Altman's films: "He loved the chaotic nature of real life, with conflicting perspectives, surprising twists, unexplained actions, and ambiguous endings. He especially loved many voices, sometimes arguing, sometimes agreeing, ideally overlapping, a cocktail party or a street scene captured as he experienced it. Julianne Moore, after seeing some of his movies, credits Altman's style of directing for her decision to become a film actress, rather than a stage actress:

Film author Charles Derry writes that Altman's films "characteristically contain perceptive observations, telling exchanges, and moments of crystal clear revelation of human folly." Because Altman was an astute observer of society and "especially interested in people," notes Derry, many of his film characters had "that sloppy imperfection associated with human beings as they are, with life as it is lived." As a result, his films are often an indirect critique of American society.

For many of Altman's films, the satirical content is evident: MASH (1970), for example, is a satirical black comedy set during the Korean War; McCabe & Mrs. Miller (1971) is a satire on Westerns; author Matthew Kennedy states that Nashville (1975) is a "brilliant satire of America immediately prior to the Bicentennial"; A Wedding (1978) is a satire on American marriage rituals and hypocrisy; Altman himself said that The Player (1992) was "a very mild satire" about the Hollywood film industry, and Vincent Canby agreed, stating that "as a satire, The Player tickles. It doesn't draw blood." The satire of his films sometimes led to their failure at the box office if their satirical nature was not understood by the distributor. Altman blames the box office failure of The Long Goodbye (1973), a detective story, on the erroneous marketing of the film as a thriller:

Similarly, Altman also blames the failure of O.C. & Stiggs on its being marketed as a typical "teenage movie," rather than what he filmed it as, a "satire of a teenage movie," he said.

Improvisation dialogue 
Altman favored stories expressing the interrelationships among several characters, being more interested in character motivation than in intricate plots. He therefore tended to sketch out only a basic plot for the film, referring to the screenplay as a "blueprint" for action. By encouraging his actors to improvise dialogue, Altman thus became known as an "actor's director," a reputation that attracted many notable actors to work as part of his large casts. Performers enjoy working with Altman in part because "he provides them with the freedom to develop their characters and often alter the script through improvisation and collaboration," notes Derry. Richard Baskin says that "Bob was rather extraordinary in his way of letting people do what they did. He trusted you to do what you did and therefore you would kill for him."

 Geraldine Chaplin, who acted in Nashville, recalls one of her first rehearsal sessions:

Altman regularly let his actors develop a character through improvisation during rehearsal or sometimes during the actual filming. Such improvisation was uncommon in film due to the high cost of movie production which requires careful planning, precise scripts, and rehearsal, before costly film was exposed. Nevertheless, Altman preferred to use improvisation as a tool for helping his actors develop their character. Altman said that "once we start shooting it's a very set thing. Improvisation is misunderstood. We don't just turn people loose." Although he tried to avoid dictating an actor's every move, preferring to let them be in control:

Carol Burnett remembers Altman admitting that many of the ideas in his films came from the actors. "You never hear a director say that. That was truly an astonishing thing," she said. Others, such as Jennifer Jason Leigh, became creatively driven:

He liked working with many of the same performers, including Shelley Duvall and Bert Remsen (7 films each); Paul Dooley (6 films); Michael Murphy (5 films); Jeff Goldblum, Lily Tomlin, Lyle Lovett, Henry Gibson, David Arkin, and John Schuck (4 films each); Tim Robbins, Carol Burnett, Belita Moreno, Richard E. Grant, Geraldine Chaplin, Craig Richard Nelson, Sally Kellerman and Keith Carradine (3 films each). Krin Gabbard adds that Altman enjoyed using actors "who flourish as improvisers," such as Elliott Gould, who starred in three of his films, MASH, The Long Goodbye and California Split. Gould recalls that when filming MASH, his first acting job with Altman, he and costar Donald Sutherland didn't think Altman knew what he was doing. He wrote years later, "I think that in hindsight, Donald and I were two elitist, arrogant actors who really weren't getting Altman's genius." Others in the cast immediately appreciated Altman's directing style. René Auberjonois explains:

Unlike television and traditional films, Altman also avoided "conventional storytelling," and would opt for showing the "busy confusion of real life," observes Albert Lindauer. Among the various techniques to achieve this effect, his films often include "a profusion of sounds and images, by huge casts or crazy characters, multiple plots or no plots at all, ... and a reliance on improvisation." A few months before he died, Altman tried to summarize the motives behind his filmmaking style:

Sound techniques 
Altman was one of the few filmmakers who "paid full attention to the possibilities of sound" when filming. He tried to replicate natural conversational sounds, even with large casts, by wiring hidden microphones to actors, then recording them talking over each other with multiple soundtracks. During the filming, he wore a headset to ensure that important dialogue could be heard, without emphasizing it. This produced a "dense audio experience" for viewers, allowing them to hear multiple scraps of dialogue, as if they were listening in on various private conversations. Altman recognized that although large casts hurt a film commercially, "I like to see a lot of stuff going on."

Altman first used overlapping soundtracks in MASH (1970), a sound technique which movie author Michael Barson describes as "a breathtaking innovation at the time." He developed it, Altman said, to force viewers to pay attention and become engaged in the film as if they were an active participant. According to some critics, one of the more extreme uses of the technique is in McCabe and Mrs. Miller (1971), also considered among his finest films.

Film historian/scholar Robert P. Kolker pointed out that the aural and visual simultaneity in Altman's films was critical as that represented an emphasis on the plurality of events, which required viewers to become active spectators.

Ensemble casts 
Overlapping dialogue among large groups of actors adds complexity to Altman's films, and they were often criticized as appearing haphazard or disconnected on first viewing. Some of his critics changed their minds after seeing them again. British film critic David Thomson gave Nashville (1975) a bad review after watching it the first time, but later wrote, "But going back to Nashville and some of the earlier films, ... made me reflect: It remains enigmatic how organized or purposeful Nashville is. ... The mosaic, or mix, permits a freedom and a human idiosyncrasy that Renoir might have admired." During the making of the film, the actors were inspired, and co-star Ronee Blakley was convinced of the film's ultimate success:

Thomson later recognized those aspects as being part of Altman's style, beginning with MASH (1970): "MASH began to develop the crucial Altman style of overlapping, blurred sound and images so slippery with zoom that there was no sense of composition. That is what makes Nashville so absorbing." Altman explained that to him such overlapping dialogue in his films was closer to reality, especially with large groups: "If you've got fourteen people at a dinner table, it seems to me it's pretty unlikely that only two of them are going to be talking." Pauline Kael writes that Altman, "the master of large ensembles, loose action, and overlapping voices, demonstrates that ... he can make film fireworks out of next to nothing."

Photography 
Altman's distinctive style of directing carried over into his preferences for camerawork. Among them was his use of widescreen compositions, intended to capture the many people or activities taking place on screen at the same time. For some films, such as McCabe and Mrs. Miller, he created a powerful visual atmosphere with cinematographer Vilmos Zsigmond, such as scenes using fluid camerawork, zoom lenses, and a smoky effect using special fog filters. Director Stanley Kubrick told Altman that "the camerawork was wonderful," and asked, "How did you do it?"

In Nashville, Altman used sets with noticeable colors of reds, whites and blues. For The Long Goodbye, he insisted that Zsigmond keep the camera mobile by mounting it to moving objects. Zsigmond states that Altman "wanted to do something different" in this film, and told him he "wanted the camera to move — all the time. Up. down. In and out. Side to side." Cinematographer Roger Deakins, discussing his use of zoom lenses, commented, "I would find it quite exciting to shoot a film with a zoom lens if it was that observational, roving kind of look that Robert Altman was known for. He'd put the camera on a jib arm and float across the scene and pick out these shots as he went along – quite a nice way of working."

Zsigmond also recalls that working with Altman was fun:

Vilmos Zsigmond's cinematography in McCabe and Mrs. Miller received a nomination by the British Academy Film Awards.

Music scores 
When using music in his films, Altman was known to be highly selective, often choosing music that he personally liked. Director Paul Thomas Anderson, who worked with him, notes that "Altman's use of music is always important," adding, "Bob loved his music, didn't he? My God, he loved his music". Since he was a "great fan" of Leonard Cohen's music, for example, saying he would "just get stoned and play that stuff" all the time he used three of his songs in McCabe and Mrs. Miller (1971), and another for the final scene in A Wedding (1978).

For Nashville (1975), Altman had numerous new country music songs written by his cast to create a realistic atmosphere. He incorporated a "hauntingly repeated melody" in The Long Goodbye (1973), and employed Harry Nilsson and Van Dyke Parks to score Popeye (1980).

A number of music experts have written about Altman's use of music, including Richard R. Ness, who wrote about the scores for many of Altman's films in an article, considered to be a valuable resource for understanding Altman's filmmaking technique. Similarly, cinema studies professor Krin Gabbard wrote an analysis of Altman's use of jazz music in Short Cuts (1993), noting that few critics have considered the "importance of the music" in the film.

Jazz was also significant in Kansas City (1996). In that film, the music is considered to be the basis of the story. Altman states that "the whole idea was not to be too specific about the story," but to have the film itself be "rather a sort of jazz." Altman's technique of making the theme of a film a form of music, was considered "an experiment nobody has tried before," with Altman admitting it was risky. "I didn't know if it would work. ... If people 'get it,' then they really tend to like it."

Influence 
Directors who are influenced by Altman include Paul Thomas Anderson, Wes Anderson, Judd Apatow, Richard Linklater, Alejandro González Iñárritu, Noah Baumbach, David Gordon Green, the Safdie brothers, Harmony Korine, and Michael Winterbottom.

Filmography

Awards and honors 

Altman received various awards and nominations including seven Academy Award nominations winning the Honorary Oscar in 2006. He received seven British Academy Film Award nominations winning twice for The Player (1992), and Gosford Park (2001). He received the Primetime Emmy Award for Outstanding Directing for a Drama Series for Tanner '88 (1988). He also received five Golden Globe Award nominations winning the Golden Globe Award for Best Director for Gosford Park. He also received various awards from film festivals including the Cannes Film Festival's prestigious Palme d'Or for M*A*S*H and the Cannes Film Festival Award for Best Director for The Player. He has also received the Berlin International Film Festival's Golden Bear, and the Venice Film Festival's Golden Lion. In 1994, he received the Directors Guild of America Lifetime Achievement Award.

Personal life

Family 
Altman was married three times: His first wife was LaVonne Elmer. They were married from 1947 to 1949, and had a daughter, Christine. His second wife was Lotus Corelli. They were married from 1950 to 1955, and had two sons, Michael and Stephen. At fourteen, Michael wrote the lyrics to "Suicide Is Painless", the theme song to Altman's movie, MASH. Stephen is a production designer who often worked with his father. Altman's third wife was Kathryn Reed. They were married from 1957 until his death in 2006. They had two sons, Robert and Matthew. Altman became the stepfather to Konni Reed when he married Kathryn.

Kathryn Altman, who died in 2016, co-authored a book about Altman that was published in 2014. She had served as a consultant and narrator for the 2014 documentary Altman, and had spoken at many retrospective screenings of her husband's films.

Homes 
In the 1960s, Altman lived for years in Mandeville Canyon in Brentwood, California. He resided in Malibu throughout the 1970s, but sold that home and the Lion's Gate production company in 1981. "I had no choice", he told The New York Times. "Nobody was answering the phone" after the flop of Popeye. He moved his family and business headquarters to New York City, but eventually moved back to Malibu, where he lived until his death.

Political views 
In November 2000, Altman claimed that he would move to Paris if George W. Bush were elected, but joked that he had meant Paris, Texas, when it came to pass. He noted that "the state would be better off if he (Bush) is out of it." Altman was an outspoken marijuana user, and served as a member of the NORML advisory board. He was also an atheist and an anti-war activist. He was one of numerous public figures, including linguist Noam Chomsky and actress Susan Sarandon, who signed the "Not in Our Name" declaration opposing the 2003 invasion of Iraq. Julian Fellowes believes that Altman's anti-war and anti-Bush stance cost him the Best Director Oscar for Gosford Park.

Altman despised the television series M*A*S*H which followed his 1970 film, citing it as being the antithesis of what his movie was about, and citing its anti-war messages as being "racist". In the 2001 DVD commentary for MASH, he stated clearly the reasons for which he disapproved of the series.

Death and legacy 
Altman died from leukemia at Cedars-Sinai Medical Center in Los Angeles on November 20, 2006, at the age of 81.

Fellow film director Paul Thomas Anderson dedicated his 2007 film There Will Be Blood to Altman. Anderson had worked as a standby director on A Prairie Home Companion for insurance purposes in the event the ailing 80-year-old Altman would be unable to finish shooting.

During a celebration tribute to Altman a few months after his death, he was described as a "passionate filmmaker" and auteur who rejected convention, creating what director Alan Rudolph called an "Altmanesque" style of films. He preferred large casts of actors and natural overlapping conversations, and encouraged his actors to improvise and express their innate creativity without fear of failing. Lily Tomlin compared him to "a great benign patriarch who was always looking out for you as an actor," adding that "you're not afraid to take chances with him."

Many of his films are described as "acid satires and counterculture character studies that redefined and reinvigorated modern cinema." Although his films spanned most film genres, such as Westerns, musicals, war films, or comedies, he was considered "anti-genre," and his films were "candidly subversive." He was known to hate the "phoniness" he saw in most mainstream films, and "he wanted to explode them" through satire.

Actor Tim Robbins, who starred in a number of Altman's films, describes some of the unique aspects of his directing method:

Altman's personal archives are located at the University of Michigan, which include about 900 boxes of personal papers, scripts, legal, business and financial records, photographs, props and related material. Altman had filmed Secret Honor at the university, as well as directed several operas there.

Since 2009, the Robert Altman Award is awarded to the director, casting director, and ensemble cast of films at the yearly Independent Spirit Awards.

In 2014, a feature-length documentary film, Altman, was released, which looks at his life and work with film clips and interviews.

See also 
 Hyperlink cinema

Footnotes

References

Bibliography

Further reading 
 
 The director's commentary on the McCabe & Mrs. Miller DVD, while focusing on that film, also to some degree covers Altman's general methodology as a director.
 Judith M. Kass. Robert Altman: American Innovator early (1978) assessment of the director's work and his interest in gambling. Part of Leonard Maltin's Popular Library filmmaker series.
 The English band Maxïmo Park have a song named "Robert Altman", a b-side to their single "Our Velocity"
 The Criterion Collection has released several of Altman's films on DVD (Short Cuts, 3 Women, Tanner '88, Secret Honor) which include audio commentary and video interviews with him that shed light on his directing style.
 
 Rick Armstrong, "Robert Altman: Critical Essays" Actors, historians, film scholars, and cultural theorists reflect on Altman and his five-decade career ... (McFarland, February 18, 2011)
 Mitchell Zuckoff, Robert Altman: The Oral Biography. New York: Alfred A. Knopf, 2009. 
 Description and details on the Short Cuts Soundtrack for more in-depth information about this title.
 Helene Keyssar, Robert Altman's America. Oxford, 1991

External links 

 Finding Aids for the Robert Altman Papers (1945-2007), Special Collections Library, University of Michigan
 
 
 
 Robert Altman at the Criterion Collection
 Listen to Robert Altman discussing his career – a British Library recording.
 Robert Altman bibliography via UC Berkeley Media Resources Center
 Still up to mischief – The Guardian, May 1, 2004
 Reverse Shot interview
 Ebert's Altman Home Companion 
 Gerald Peary interview
 Literature on Robert Altman
 "Altman: Would you go to a movie that was hailed as a masterpiece?" by Roger Ebert 
 Bomb magazine interview 
 Artist of the Month: Robert Altman at Hyena Productions 
 The films of Robert Altman, Hell Is For Hyphenates, June 30, 2014
 Robert Altman Obituary, by Stephen Rea, 'Field Day Review 3' (Dublin, 2007)
Videos
 , 11 min.
 , 7 min.
 , 90 min.
 , 60 min.

1925 births
2006 deaths
20th-century American dramatists and playwrights
20th-century American male writers
20th-century American screenwriters
20th-century atheists
21st-century American dramatists and playwrights
21st-century American male writers
21st-century American screenwriters
21st-century atheists
Academy Honorary Award recipients
American anti–Iraq War activists
American atheists
American cannabis activists
American documentary filmmakers
American film directors
American film editors
American film producers
American male dramatists and playwrights
American male film actors
American male screenwriters
American male television writers
American music video directors
American opera librettists
American people of English descent
American people of German descent
American people of Irish descent
American satirists
American social commentators
American television directors
American television producers
Best Director BAFTA Award winners
Best Director Golden Globe winners
Cannes Film Festival Award for Best Director winners
CAS Career Achievement Award honorees
Deaths from cancer in California
Deaths from leukemia
Directors of Golden Bear winners
Directors of Golden Lion winners
Directors of Palme d'Or winners
Fellows of the American Academy of Arts and Sciences
Film directors from Los Angeles
Film directors from Missouri
Film producers from California
Film producers from Missouri
Film theorists
Former Roman Catholics
Heart transplant recipients
Honorary Golden Bear recipients
Humor researchers
Independent Spirit Award for Best Director winners
Mass media theorists
People from Mandeville Canyon, Los Angeles
Postmodernist filmmakers
Primetime Emmy Award winners
Screenwriters from California
Screenwriters from Missouri
United States Army Air Forces officers
United States Army Air Forces personnel of World War II
Wentworth Military Academy and College alumni
Western (genre) film directors
Writers about activism and social change
Writers from Kansas City, Missouri